LG Champion's Park is a multi-purpose sports facility in Icheon, South Korea. The venue is used by the farm team of the LG Twins and by the KBL team Changwon LG Sakers.

See also 
 GS Champions Park

Baseball venues in South Korea
Basketball venues in South Korea
Sports venues in Gyeonggi Province
LG Twins
Changwon LG Sakers
Champion's Park
Buildings and structures in Icheon
Sports venues completed in 2014
2014 establishments in South Korea